Kirsti Ilvessalo (after marriage, Kirsti Ilvessalo-Viljakainen; 25 May 1920 – 5 July 2019) was a Finnish textile artist, best known for her ryijy. She received awards at the Triennale di Milano (1951, 1954, 1960), and the Order of the Lion of Finland (1979).

Biography
Kirsti Päivi Ilvessalo was born in Helsinki on 25 May 1920. She received her education at the Aalto University School of Arts, Design and Architecture 1940–1944. 

Ilvessalo was a leader in the Friends of Finnish Handicraft association during the period of 1947 to 1952. Subsequently, she opened her own textile studio. She taught textile composition at the School of Art and Design in 1947–1960. She was best known for her ryijy, which appeared in several foreign museums (including the Victoria and Albert Museum in London and the Nationalmuseum in Stockholm). She also composed and manufactured interior textiles for a number of public buildings. She also designed jewelry and wallpaper.

Ilvessalo won the gold medal at the Triennale di Milano in 1951 and 1960 as well as the Grand Prix in 1954. In 1979, she was awarded the Order of the Lion of Finland. She died on 5 July 2019.

Awards

 1951, Gold Medal, Triennale di Milano
 1954, Grand Prix, Triennale di Milano
 1960, Gold Medal, Triennale di Milano
 1979, Order of the Lion of Finland

References

1920 births
2019 deaths
Aalto University alumni
Artists from Helsinki
Finnish textile artists
Recipients of the Order of the Lion of Finland